Andreas Neagu (born  in Brilon) is a German-born Romanian bobsledder.

Neagu competed at the 2014 Winter Olympics for Romania. He teamed with Paul Muntean, Florin Cezar Crăciun, Dănuț Moldovan and Bogdan Laurentiu Otavă in the four-man event, finishing 24th.

As of April 2014, his best showing at the World Championships is 26th, coming in the four-man event in 2013.

Neagu made his World Cup debut in November 2012. As of April 2014, his best finish is 16th, in a four-man event in 2012-13 at Winterberg.

References

1985 births
Living people
Olympic bobsledders of Romania
People from Brilon
Sportspeople from Arnsberg (region)
Bobsledders at the 2014 Winter Olympics
Romanian male bobsledders
German people of Romanian descent